Roosevelt Bouie (born January 21, 1958) is a retired American basketball player. He is known both for his All-American college years at Syracuse University and his storied career in Italy's top league.

Bouie played for coach Jim Boeheim at Syracuse from 1976 to 1980, combining with teammate Louis Orr to form what became popularly known as the "Louie and Bouie Show."  The duo was named so after the student newspaper The Daily Orange ran a caricature of them heading up the basketball court in tuxedos and top hats. A 6'11" center, Bouie was drafted in the second round of the 1980 NBA Draft by the Dallas Mavericks.  Bouie never played in the NBA, however, opting instead for a career in Italy where he averaged 16.3 points and 10.5 rebounds per game over 12 seasons.   Bouie also played one season in Spain for Ourense.

References

External links
Italian League profile 
Spanish League profile
sports-reference college stats
basketball-reference international stats
REALGM player profile

1958 births
Living people
All-American college men's basketball players
American expatriate basketball people in Italy
American expatriate basketball people in Spain
American men's basketball players
Basketball players from New York (state)
Centers (basketball)
Club Ourense Baloncesto players
Dallas Mavericks draft picks
Liga ACB players
Pallacanestro Cantù players
Pallacanestro Reggiana players
People from Kendall, New York
Syracuse Orange men's basketball players
Victoria Libertas Pallacanestro players